Solanum aviculare, commonly called poroporo or pōporo (New Zealand), bumurra (Dharug), kangaroo apple, pam plum (Australia), or New Zealand nightshade, is a soft-wooded shrub native to New Zealand and the east coast of Australia.

The Māori names pōroporo and pōporo come from a generic Proto-Polynesian term for any Solanum species and similar berry-bearing plants. Other names used for Solanum aviculare in the language include hōreto and peoi.

Taxonomy and systematics
Solanum aviculare was first described by German naturalist Georg Forster in 1786, from a collection in New Zealand.

Solanum aviculare is similar to Solanum laciniatum, with which it has been confused. It is mostly found south of Auckland and is very common in the southern North Island, South, Stewart and Chatham Islands. Solanum laciniatum is the most commonly found species overseas where it is often incorrectly called S. aviculare.

In addition to this two varieties of S. aviculare have been named. S. aviculare var. albiflorum is a minor genetic sport of S. aviculare and is generally not regarded as distinct but S. aviculare var. latifolium has a different growth habit, much broader, usually entire leaves and larger flowers, and in New Zealand (where it is endemic) it is still accepted as distinct by many botanists.

 Solanum aviculare var. albiflorum Cheeseman
 Solanum aviculare var. latifolium G.T.S.Baylis

Description

Distribution and habitat
Solanum aviculare grows in rainforests, wet forests and rainforest margins on clay soils. Associated Australian species include the rainforest plants Golden sassafras (Doryphora sassafras), black wattle (Acacia melanoxylon), and lillypilly (Acmena smithii), and wet forest species brown barrel (Eucalyptus fastigata) and turpentine (Syncarpia glomulifera).

Ecology
Bees are thought to pollinate the flowers.

Uses
The leaves and unripe fruits of S. aviculare contain the toxic alkaloid solasodine. S. aviculare is cultivated in Russia and Hungary for the solasidine which is extracted and used as a base material for the production of steroid contraceptives.

The plant is also used as a rootstock for grafting eggplant.

Australian Aborigines used the fruit as a poultice on swollen joints. The plant contains a steroid which is important to the production of cortisone.

See also
 Solanum laciniatum

References

External links

 Plants of New Zealand S. aviculare

aviculare
Edible Solanaceae
Solanales of Australia
Flora of New South Wales
Flora of the North Island
Flora of Norfolk Island
Flora of Queensland
Flora of South Australia
Flora of Victoria (Australia)
Eudicots of Western Australia
Crops originating from Australia
Crops originating from New Zealand
Plants described in 1786